The 2010 season for  began in January with the Tour de San Luis and ended in October at the Giro di Lombardia. As a UCI ProTour team, they were automatically invited and obliged to send a squad to every event in the ProTour.

The team won two of the season's three Grand Tours, the Giro d'Italia, with Ivan Basso and the Vuelta a España with Vincenzo Nibali. Franco Pellizotti was expected to ride both of the season's first two Grand Tours, but he was sidelined by the team after the UCI identified him as having irregular blood values as part of their biological passport program, values possibly indicative of doping. Pellizotti fought the charges, proclaiming his innocence, and was later cleared to return to racing. However, delays in his case meant that almost all of his 2010 season was wiped out.

2010 roster
Ages as of January 1, 2010.

Riders who joined the team for the 2010 season

Riders who left the team during or after the 2009 season

One-day races

Spring classics

Fall races

Stage races
The team sent a squad to the Tour de San Luis in mid-January, coming away with two stage wins. Chicchi won the mass sprint finish to the first stage, and Nibali followed with an individual time trial win in stage 4. The win put Nibali in the race leader's orange jersey, which he would retain through the conclusion of the event. The team was successful in stage hunting in Asia in February, with Chicchi winning two stages in the Tour of Qatar and Bennati one in the Tour of Oman. Later in February, Kreuziger won the most difficult stage of the Giro di Sardegna en route to the overall victory. The Giro di Sardegna was mostly composed of flat stages; the top three finishers in the hilly second stage (Kreuziger, Chris Horner, and Thomas Voeckler) finished in that same order in the final overall standings, showing how little the standings changed on the other days.

Grand Tours

Giro d'Italia
Liquigas-Doimo entered the Giro with Basso a strong favorite for overall victory. Pellizotti was supposed to ride the Giro as a co-captain, but he was forcibly sidelined as a result of his announced irregular blood values as part of the UCI's biological passport program. Nibali, who had been planning to captain the squad sent to the partially concurrent Tour of California, took his place in the Giro.

Sabatini was the best sprinter the team sent to the Giro, and he contested the Giro's first road race stage with the leading sprinters, taking third in the bunch finish. The next day, in another depleted bunch finish, Nibali was eighth. He had made the finishing selection both days, and was fourth in the overall classification prior to the transfer to Italy, five seconds back of race leader Alexander Vinokourov in the standings. In the stage 4 team time trial, the squad took a convincing victory, finishing the  course with six riders together (the seventh, Bodnar, had fallen off the pace only in the final kilometer) in 36'37". Only two other squads finished in under 37 minutes.

Nibali stayed out of trouble and retained the jersey over the next two days, but was bound for difficulties in stage 7. This was a long stage, incorporating unpaved roads near the finish, and happened to be run on a day with very heavy rainfall. Nibali crashed on the first section of unpaved road, and needed a bike change. Vinokourov seized the opportunity to take off, and he finished, along with Cadel Evans and Damiano Cunego, sufficiently ahead of Nibali to re-take the pink jersey. Basso also crashed during this stage; the day's results took them from first and second overall down to fifth (Nibali) and eighth (Basso). The favorites finished together over the next three days. Attrition from other riders moved Nibali and Basso up to third and fourth overall, but their time gaps to Vinokourov were unchanged. In stage 11, a 50-rider group broke away from the peloton. This group contained several noteworthy riders, such as youth classification leader (and eventual winner) Richie Porte and squad leaders Carlos Sastre and Bradley Wiggins. Liquigas did have Dall'Antonia, Kišerlovski, and Agnoli in the break, but Basso and Nibali were notably left behind and ceded 13 minutes to this group. This moved them both, along with fellow overall favorites like Evans, Cunego, and Michele Scarponi, out of the top ten with more than ten minutes in deficit to new race leader Porte. Kišerlovski and Agnoli both moved into the top ten, though, at third and fifth, respectively. Liquigas-Doimo, and  had all been mounting a chase of this breakaway group for a time, a chase which brought their advantage from 20 minutes down to 13. The teamwork abruptly stopped when Liquigas-Doimo stopped sending riders to the front of the peloton. The teams blamed each other for the peloton's failure on the day, and there was speculation that Liquigas-Doimo, fielding strong favorites for overall victory, had given away the Giro after the day's result. Basso later admitted that they had made a potentially grave mistake giving this group as much time as they had.

Stage 12 had the makings of a fairly straightforward sprint stage, but in the last kilometers of the stage, a 10-rider group consisting largely of Giro favorites split off the peloton and finished ahead of them. Nibali and Basso both made this selection, safely finishing sixth and tenth respectively on the day. The squad went to work in stage 14, which went over Monte Grappa. Using rider after rider, until each bonked and fell off the pace, the squad set a pace on the climb that eventually whittled the leading group down to just Nibali, Basso, Evans, and Scarponi. Nibali took the most aggressive descent down the Grappa and soloed to victory 23 seconds ahead of the other three, and 2'25" ahead of the peloton. This result put Nibali back in the top ten overall. Using much the same strategy in the Monte Zoncolan climb the next day, Basso was the last rider left out front as the stage neared its finish. He put in attack after attack to try to shed Evans in the stage's final kilometers, at last succeeding to take the win 1'19" ahead of the Australian. This result moved Basso from 11th all the way to third in the overall standings, while Nibali also moved up, to seventh. Both squad leaders turned in solid rides in the uphill time trial to Plan de Corones in stage 16, each moving up a place in the general classification. Stage 18 was the last mass finish in the Giro, and the squad took two of the top ten places in the sprint, with Dall'Antonia coming in third and Sabatini ninth.

The Giro's last two road race stages were very climbing-intensive. The first of them finished at Aprica, where Basso had previously won when he won his first Giro championship in 2006. Much like they had on the Grappa and the Zoncolan, the squad used up its support riders one at a time to set a selective pace. Nibali, Basso, and Scarponi were the last three riders together at the front of the race, topping the Passo del Mortirolo several minutes ahead of race leader David Arroyo and other riders. Basso rode a conservative descent on the Aprica, with the other two needing to wait for him several times. Arroyo rode a very aggressive descent, catching four riders between him and the leading Italian trio. They coalesced into a five-man chase group before the Aprica climb. Basso, Nibali, and Scarponi held only half a minute's advantage on the Arroyo group when the climb began. Basso and Nibali both took long, strenuous turns on the front of their group, and their time gap over the Arroyo group grew large enough for Basso to become the prospective race leader. Scarponi did very little work on the climb, and as such was the freshest at the finish and easily took the stage win. Nibali allowed Basso second place in order to maximize his time bonus. Arroyo's group did not cross the finish line until over three minutes had passed, giving Basso the race leadership and putting Nibali in third overall. The squad, by this point the only squad still fully intact, controlled the race effectively on the Giro's final road race stage. Basso, Scarponi, and Evans rode the stage-concluding Passo del Tonale ahead of the other Giro elite, including Nibali. Scarponi's 18-second gap over Nibali put him one second from taking the third step on the podium from Nibali, but Nibali was a much stronger time trialist, securing his position in the stage 21 time trial in Verona. Basso had over a minute in advantage to Arroyo at this point, so the time trial had a celebratory feel to it for him. He finished the stage in 15th place, but easily won the Giro with this performance, gleefully meeting his family inside the Arena di Verona before taking the final pink jersey. The squad was dominant, winning both the Trofeo Fast Team and Trofeo Super Team classifications. They also won the Fair Play award, avoiding penalty points for minor technical infringements, and were the only squad to have all nine riders complete the race.

Tour de France
Giro champion Basso, along with Kreuziger, led the team's squad for the Tour de France. Basso hoped to pull a Giro/Tour double, which would have been the first since Marco Pantani in 1998, but was happy simply to return to the race for the first time since finishing second overall in the 2005 edition. Kreuziger was to be his lieutenant, and several experienced domestiques rounded the squad.

There were numerous crashes in the Tour's first two road race stages. Basso crashed in stage 1, and Kreuziger was one of dozens of riders to crash on the Col du Stockeu in Spa in stage 2. At this point, Kreuziger was 17th and Basso 53rd. They both lost further time on the cobblestones in stage 3. In a more typical flat stage in stage 4, Oss took eighth in the bunch finish. Basso and Kreuziger both finished with the group of overall race favorites in stage 8, the Tour's first major mountain stage. While they lost ten seconds to Andy Schleck and Samuel Sánchez, the result moved Basso up 14 places in the general classification, going from 27th to 13th, and Kreuziger from 12th up to 7th. Basso finished a minute ahead of Kreuziger in stage 9, moving up to 10th overall while Kreuziger slipped to 11th.

Following stages won by sprinters and breakaways, the otherwise flat stage 12 ended with a short, steep climb to Mende, opening up the possibility for changes to the overall standings. Kreuziger and Basso both lost time in this stage, with Kreuziger ceding 15 seconds to stage winner Joaquim Rodríguez and to Alberto Contador, while Basso lost 31. They switched places in the overall standings as a result, with Basso falling to 11th and Kreuziger moving up to 10th. In the high mountain stage 14, Basso was just 21st at the finish, but due to attrition of other riders, he again moved back into 10th place overall with this result. Kreuziger was 28th, and fell to 12th overall. Both leaders rode poorly in stage 15, on the Port de Balès. Kreuziger was 19th on the day, losing a little over a minute to the race's elite. Basso was 32nd, nearly three minutes off the pace. Vandborg, however, was tenth on this stage after having been part of the morning breakaway. Two stages later, in the summit stage finish at the Col du Tourmalet, Kreuziger again returned to the top ten overall, taking tenth on the day. He finished in that position upon the Tour's conclusion. Basso, for his part, had come down with bronchitis upon the Tour's entry to the Pyrenees, ceding time in each of the mountain stages in the final week. Antibiotics given him by race doctors also weakened his form. His most dramatic time loss came in stage 16 to Pau, when he was 35 minutes back of stage winner Pierrick Fédrigo, finishing with the last group on the road. He nonetheless finished the race, coming in 32nd, just under an hour back of Tour champion Contador. The squad was ninth in the teams classification.

Vuelta a España

Away from competition

Franco Pellizotti biological passport case

Season victories

Footnotes

References

2010 road cycling season by team
Liquigas
2010 in Italian sport